Jerusalem was the first center of the church, according to the Book of Acts, and according to the Catholic Encyclopedia the location of "the first Christian church".

Jerusalem church may refer to:

 Early centers of Christianity#Jerusalem
 Council of Jerusalem
 Cenacle
 Church of the Holy Sepulchre
 Church of Jerusalem (disambiguation)
 Patriarch of Jerusalem (disambiguation)
 Patriarchate of Jerusalem (disambiguation)
 Jerusalem Church (Berlin)
 Jerusalem's Church, Copenhagen